Hermsdorf is a town in the Saale-Holzland district of the state of Thuringia in eastern Germany. It is especially known for the motorway junction "Hermsdorfer Kreuz" where the two German autobahns A 4 (Frankfurt - Dresden) and A 9 (Berlin - Munich) meet.

Hermsdorf-Klosterlausnitz station is on the Weimar–Gera railway.

Personalities 
 Petra Lux (born 1956), Civil rights activist and Taichi teacher

References

External links
In German:

 Official website of Hermsdorf
 hermsdorf-thueringen.de
 SVHermsdorf.de
 750-jahre-hermsdorf.de
 jugendhaus-hermsdorf.de
 holzlandgymnasium.de

Towns in Thuringia
Saale-Holzland-Kreis
Duchy of Saxe-Altenburg